Sunset Hill is a mountain in Barnstable County, Massachusetts. Squaw Island is located west of Sunset Hill.

References

Mountains of Massachusetts
Mountains of Barnstable County, Massachusetts